Arboriculture is the cultivation, management, and study of individual trees, shrubs, vines, and other perennial woody plants. The science of arboriculture studies how these plants grow and respond to cultural practices and to their environment. The practice of arboriculture includes cultural techniques such as selection, planting, training, fertilization, pest and pathogen control, pruning, shaping, and removal.

Overview 
A person who practices or studies arboriculture can be termed an arborist or an arboriculturist. A tree surgeon is more typically someone who is trained in the physical maintenance and manipulation of trees and therefore more a part of the arboriculture process rather than an arborist. Risk management, legal issues, and aesthetic considerations have come to play prominent roles in the practice of arboriculture. Businesses often need to hire arboriculturists to complete "tree hazard surveys" and generally manage the trees on-site to fulfill occupational safety and health obligations.

Arboriculture is primarily focused on individual woody plants and trees maintained for permanent landscape and amenity purposes, usually in gardens, parks or other populated settings, by arborists, for the enjoyment, protection, and benefit of people.

Arboricultural matters are also considered to be within the practice of urban forestry yet the clear and separate divisions are not distinct or discreet.

UK

Within the United Kingdom trees are considered as a material consideration within the town planning system and may be conserved as amenity landscape features.

The role of the Arborist or Local Government Arboricultural Officer is likely to have a great effect on such matters. Identification of trees of high quality which may have extensive longevity is a key element in the preservation of trees.

Urban and rural trees may benefit from statutory protection under the Town and Country Planning system. Such protection can result in the conservation and improvement of the urban forest as well as rural settlements.

Historically the profession divides into the operational and professional areas. These might be further subdivided into the private and public sectors. The profession is broadly considered as having one trade body known as the Arboricultural Association, although the Institute of Chartered Foresters offers a route for professional recognition and chartered arboriculturist status.

The qualifications associated with the industry range from vocational to Doctorate. Arboriculture is a comparatively young industry.

See also

 Agroforestry
 Arborist
 Bonsai
 European Arboricultural Council
 Forester
 Forestry
 Fruit tree pruning
 Horticulture
 International Society of Arboriculture
 Landscape architecture
 Landscaping
 Silviculture
 Silvology
 Tree forks
 Tree shaping
 Tropical horticulture
 Viticulture

References

External links

 Arboriculture Australia Australia
 Arboricultural Association UK
 International Society of Arboriculture (USA)
 European Arboricultural Council
 BatsandTrees.com Promoting the importance of British trees to bats
 Institute of Chartered Foresters The UK based Chartered body for forestry and arboricultural professionals
 American Forests Urban forestry resources
 Encyclopædia Britannica
 

Horticultural techniques
Horticulture
Trees
Forest management